Let It Go is the third studio album by jazz pianist Josh Nelson. It was released by Native Language Music on September 25, 2007.

Track listing

Personnel
 Josh Nelson - Acoustic Piano, Rhodes, Hammond C-3 organ, Glockenspiel
 Darek "Oles" Oleszkiewicz - Acoustic Bass
 Matt Wilson - Drums, Percussion
 Seamus Blake - Tenor Saxophone
 Sara Gazarek - Vocals (on track 4)
 Anthony Wilson - Guitars
 Supernova String Quintet - Strings (on tracks 4 & 7)
 Robert Anderson - Violin
 Reiko Nakano - Violin
 Miguel Atwood-Ferguson - Viola
 Jacob Szekely - Cello

External links
All About Jazz - CD/LP Track Review - Josh Nelson | Let It Go

References

Josh Nelson albums
2007 albums
Instrumental albums